Chad La Tourette (born October 7, 1988 in Livermore, California) is an American former distance swimmer.  La Tourette is a six-time medalist (three golds, three silvers) at the World University Games and two-time silver medalist at the Pan Pacific Swimming Championships.

Career

At the 2010 National Championships, La Tourette competed in the 400 and 1500 m freestyle.  In the 400 m freestyle, La Tourette finished in 4th place. In the 1500 m freestyle, La Tourette handily won with a time of 14:55.39 with his closest competitor eight seconds back.

At the 2010 Pan Pacific Swimming Championships, La Tourette won two silver medals behind Canadian swimmer Ryan Cochrane.  In the 1500 m freestyle, La Tourette finished with a time of 14:54.48, five seconds behind the eventual winner Cochrane. In the 800 m freestyle, held three days after the 1500 m freestyle, La Tourette finished with a time of 7:51.62. La Tourette said he was not disappointed with his performances but only regretted not staying with Cochrane more.

At the 2011 World Aquatics Championships in Shanghai, La Tourette competed in two events, the 800 and 1500 m freestyle.  In his first event, the 800 m freestyle, La Tourette finished in 6th place with a time of 7:46.52. In the 1500 m freestyle, La Tourette finished in 5th place with a time of 14:52.36.

At the 2012 United States Olympic Trials in Omaha, Nebraska, La Tourette just missed making the Olympic team by placing third in the 1500 m freestyle with a time of 14:57.53.

Achievements

Personal bests
.

References

External links

 
 

1988 births
Living people
American male freestyle swimmers
Stanford Cardinal men's swimmers
Universiade medalists in swimming
People from Livermore, California
Universiade gold medalists for the United States
Universiade silver medalists for the United States
Medalists at the 2007 Summer Universiade
Medalists at the 2009 Summer Universiade